Thackaringa is a rural locality, civil parish, railway stop and cattle station in Far Western New South Wales.

Location
Thackaringa is located at 141.0623°, −32.0245°, 489.263 km from Sydney and between Cockburn, South Australia on the border with South Australia and by Silverton in the north-east. Thackaringa is at an altitude of approximately 204m.

Geography 
Thackaringa is arid and sparsely settled with the economy derived mainly from broad acre agriculture, though some mining occurs.
Thackaringa is on the Silverton Tramway and Thackaringa railway station operated from 2 January 1889 until 
12-Jan-1970.

The nearest town is Cockburn, South Australia.

Geology
The northern part of the district is cut by a large retrograde shear zone containing large garnets and refractory minerals.... There are many other small mineral deposits found in the Thackaringa district where quartz veins and/or granitic rocks have crystallised including the Thackaringa davidite belt and pods of large rutile crystals.

Climate
Thackaringa has a Köppen climate classification of BWh and BWk desert.

History
The Parish is part of the traditional lands of the Wiljali people.

The area was opened by Europeans due to the discovery of minerals in the 19th century. There was a grazing property, known as Thackaringa Station, and the first discovery of silver ore in the area was made there in 1875, by Julius Nickel who was digging a well. In 1888, the population of Thackaringa was between 200 and 300 people. Silver, lead, feldspar and beryl are still extracted in the area today.

References

Populated places in New South Wales
Parishes of New South Wales
Mining towns in New South Wales
Ghost towns in New South Wales